The Future Arena (Portuguese: Arena do Futuro) was a temporary sporting venue in Barra da Tijuca, Rio de Janeiro, Brazil, that was used for handball at the 2016 Summer Olympics, volleyball at the 2016 Summer Olympics and goalball at the 2016 Summer Paralympics.

After the games, the venue was planned to be dismantled and reassembled as four schools. As of August 2017, these plans have been abandoned by Rio's mayor Marcelo Crivella.

References

Venues of the 2016 Summer Olympics
Olympic handball venues
Barra Olympic Park
Indoor arenas in Brazil
Handball venues in Brazil